Thomas Lucas ( – ) was an English footballer who played for Liverpool and the England national team. He subsequently played for Kent League Ashford United.

References

External links
Player profile at LFChistory.net

1895 births
1953 deaths
Ashford United F.C. players
Association football fullbacks
England international footballers
English Football League players
English Football League representative players
English footballers
Footballers from St Helens, Merseyside
Leyton Orient F.C. players
Liverpool F.C. players